Cholest-4-en-3-one 26-monooxygenase (CYP125, CYP125A1, cholest-4-en-3-one 27-monooxygenase) is an enzyme with systematic name cholest-4-en-3-one,NADH:oxygen oxidoreductase (26-hydroxylating). This enzyme catalyses the following chemical reaction

 cholest-4-en-3-one + NADH + H+ + O2  26-hydroxycholest-4-en-3-one + NAD+ + H2O

Cholest-4-en-3-one 26-monooxygenase is a heme thiolate (P450) enzyme.

References

External links 
 

EC 1.14.13